Inga Kristine "Nanna" Stenersen (January 26, 1914 – June 22, 1977) was a Norwegian actress.

Stenersen was born in Oslo, the daughter of the artillery captain Fredrik Christian Krohg Stenersen (1877–1965) and Regine née Johansen (1878–?). She debuted in 1933 at the Carl Johan Theater (Carl Johan Teatret) and later worked for the Central Theater and Oslo New Theater. Stenersen performed in revues, comedies, and operettas. She also appeared as a wise judge of human character in more serious roles, but she is best remembered for her appearances in Norwegian films. She died in Oslo in 1977.

Theater roles
 The Threepenny Opera: Polly Peachum
 Mam'zelle Nitouche: title role
 All of Finn Bø's summer comedies

Filmography
 1933: 5 raske piger (Danish) as Irene From
 1933: Jeppe på bjerget as a friend of the baron 
 1938: Styrman Karlssons flammor (Swedish) as Bessie Mathiesen
 1942: Den farlige leken as Helene Blom
 1951: Vi gifter oss as Babben
 1953: Ung frue forsvunnet as Birgit Lie, a pharmacist and friend
 1954: Kasserer Jensen as Mrs. Jensen
 1957: Fjols til fjells as a maid
 1959: 5 loddrett as Randi Jespersen, Knut's wife
 1960: Millionær for en aften as Mrs. Hammer, a boarding house operator

References

External links

Nanna Stenersen at the Swedish Film Database

1914 births
1977 deaths
Norwegian stage actresses
Norwegian film actresses
20th-century Norwegian actresses
Actresses from Oslo